Jadunath Supakar was an Indian artist and textile designer. He was born in 1931 in Sambalpur in the Indian state of Odisha and was known for his contributions for the popularization of handloom industry of Varanasi. He was a recipient of the Odisha Lalit Kala Academy Award and his creations have been exhibited in several countries. The Government of India awarded him the fourth highest Indian civilian honour of Padma Shri in 1985. His son, Sribhash Chandra Supakar, is also a textile designer and a national award winner.

References

1931 births
Living people
Indian male painters
People from Sambalpur district
Recipients of the Padma Shri in trade and industry
Indian textile designers
20th-century Indian painters
Painters from Odisha
20th-century Indian male artists